Mangnejo is a Sindhi tribe in Sindh, Pakistan. Mangneja tribe is settled in Kamber Shahdadkot District Khairpur, Karachi, Sukkur, Naushahro Feroze, Tando Allahyar, Hyderabad and Larkano districts of Sindh.

The Mangneja speak the Sindhi language.

Sindhi tribes
Pakistani culture